Nobile, a Latin word meaning noble, may refer to:
 Nobile (aristocracy), the Italian equivalent of the landed gentry
 Nobile (crater), a crater on the moon
 Nobile Glacier, a glacier in Antarctica

People 
Arielle Nobile (born 1979), American film director and producer 
 Leo Nobile (1922–2006), American football player
 Luigi Nobile (1921–2009), Italian football player
 Philip Nobile, American writer
 Roberto Nobile (born 1947), Italian actor.
 Salvatore Nobile (born 1964), Italian football player
 Umberto Nobile (1885–1978), Italian explorer and aeronautical engineer

See also
 Nobiles
 Nobilis (disambiguation)